Cleveland is a census-designated place (CDP) in Charlotte County, Florida, United States. The population was 3,435 at the 2020 census. It is part of the Sarasota-Bradenton-Punta Gorda Combined Statistical Area.

Geography
Cleveland is located in north-central Charlotte County at  (26.955877, -81.996827). It is bordered on the north by the Peace River and on the west by the community of Solana. Interstate 75 separates Cleveland from Solana and serves both communities from Exit 164.

Demographics

As of the census of 2000, there were 3,268 people, 1,571 households, and 1,007 families residing in the CDP. The racial makeup of the CDP was 97.83% White, 0.40% African American, 0.34% Native American, 0.21% Asian, 0.03% Pacific Islander, 0.49% from other races, and 0.70% from two or more races. Hispanic or Latino of any race were 1.44% of the population.

There were 1,571 households, out of which 14.8% had children under the age of 18 living with them, 54.6% were married couples living together, 6.3% had a female householder with no husband present, and 35.9% were non-families. 29.9% of all households were made up of individuals, and 17.3% had someone living alone who was 65 years of age or older.  The average household size was 2.08 and the average family size was 2.52.

In the CDP, the population was spread out, with 14.3% under the age of 18, 5.5% from 18 to 24, 17.7% from 25 to 44, 26.8% from 45 to 64, and 35.6% who were 65 years of age or older.  The median age was 54 years. For every 100 females, there were 100.0 males.  For every 100 females age 18 and over, there were 96.8 males.

The median income for a household in the CDP was $31,537, and the median income for a family was $37,208. Males had a median income of $30,778 versus $20,667 for females. The per capita income for the CDP was $21,468.  About 5.9% of families and 8.4% of the population were below the poverty line, including 3.9% of those under age 18 and 6.3% of those age 65 or over.

References

Census-designated places in Charlotte County, Florida
Census-designated places in Florida
Former municipalities in Florida